Ojców National Park is a national park in Kraków County, Lesser Poland Voivodeship in southern Poland, established in 1956. It takes its name from the village of Ojców, where it also has its headquarters. Chopin visited Ojców in 1829.

Geography 
Karst topography of soluble bedrock characterizes the park, which in addition to two river (the Prądnik and Saspówka) valleys contains numerous limestone cliffs, ravines, and over 400 caves. The area is also noted for its rock formations, the most famous being Hercules' Club, a -high limestone column.

Ojcowski Park is very biodiverse; over 5500 species reside in the park. These include 4600 species of insects (including 1700 of beetles and 1075 of butterflies) and 135 of birds. Mammals include the beaver, badger, ermine, and 15 species of bats, many of which hibernate in the park's caves during the winter.

Waters 
The water network in its present shape developed in the end of the Tertiary period as a result of deep erosion of streams. The main watercourse is the Pradnik. Its tributary in the Park is the Saspowka. The streams are supplied with water from about 20 springs in karst cracks, called "wywierzyska" (rising springs).

Human habitation and culture
The earliest settlement in the area dates to the Paleolithic, approximately 120,000 years ago. The Ojców region is rich in flint, which attracted early humans.

The park contains numerous castles, including a ruined Gothic castle at Ojców and a better-preserved Renaissance castle at Pieskowa Skała, both on the tourist Trail of the Eagles' Nests. There are two museums in the park, the Professor Władyslaw Szafer Museum (named for the first person to advocate the creation of a national park in the Ojców area), and a branch of the Kraków-based National Art Collection, located in the Pieskowa Skała castle.

See also 
National Parks of Poland
Białowieża National Park
Tunel Wielki

Gallery

References 

 The Board of Polish National Parks
 Ojcowski National Park at Polish National Parks by Zbigniew Zwolińsky
 Official website Internet Archive
 Tourist Information of Ojcow National Park

National parks of Poland
Parks in Lesser Poland Voivodeship
Ojców
Protected areas established in 1956
1956 establishments in Poland
Central European mixed forests